The Victoria's Secret Fashion Show is an annual fashion show sponsored by Victoria's Secret, an American brand of lingerie and sleepwear. Victoria's Secret uses the show to promote and market its goods in high-profile settings. The show featured some of the world's leading fashion models, such as Victoria's Secret Angels, Lais Ribeiro, Elsa Hosk, Jasmine Tookes, Martha Hunt, Sara Sampaio, Romee Strijd, Stella Maxwell, Taylor Hill, Josephine Skriver, also with head angels Adriana Lima, Candice Swanepoel and Behati Prinsloo making her comeback in two years. The show also featured PINK spokesmodels, Grace Elizabeth and Zuri Tibby, also with Chinese models, Sui He and Ming Xi. Lily Aldridge was also absent due to her pregnancy.

The 2018 Victoria's Secret Fashion Show was recorded in New York City at the Pier 94, on November 8. The show featured musical performances by Shawn Mendes, Rita Ora, The Chainsmokers, Bebe Rexha, Halsey, Leela James, Kelsea Ballerini, and The Struts. The show featured seven main segments, along with a segment paying tribute to Adriana Lima, marking her retirement from modeling for Victoria's Secret.

This was the last annual Victoria's Secret Fashion Show.

ABC aired the show's television special, The Victoria’s Secret Fashion Show Holiday Special, on December 2, 2018.

Fashion show segments

Segment 1: Glam Royale

Segment 2: Golden Angels

Special Segment: Thank You Adriana

Segment 3: Flights of Fancy

Segment 4: PINK

Segment 5: Floral Fantasy

Segment 6: Downtown Angel

Segment 7: Celestial Angel

Finale 

 Taylor Hill,  Jasmine Tookes,  Elsa Hosk,  Adriana Lima,  Behati Prinsloo &  Candice Swanepoel closed the finale

Index

References

Victoria's Secret
2018 in fashion